Tolitoli Regency is a regency of Central Sulawesi Province of Indonesia. It covers an area of 4,079.77 km2 and had a population of 211,296 at the 2010 Census and 225,154 at the 2020 Census; the official estimate as at mid 2021 was 226,796, comprising 115,735 male and 111,061 female inhabitants. It was previously part of another regency together with the current Buol Regency, named Buol Tolitoli Regency, but this was split in early 2000 after rapid decentralization of the Indonesian government. Its regency seat is located at Tolitoli (in Baolan District), which is a port town and where its population is concentrated.

Administrative districts 
The Tolitoli Regency was divided in 2020 into ten districts (kecamatan), which are tabulated below with their areas and their populations at the 2010 Census and the 2020 Census, together with the official estimates as at mid 2021. The table also includes the location of the district administrative centres, the number of administrative villages in each district (totalling 103 rural desa and 6 urban kelurahan in total), and its post code.

Notes: (a) including 7 offshore islands, the largest being Pulau Simatang off the north coast of the district. (b) including 29 offshore islands, the largest being Pulau Kabetan off the northwest coast of the district. (c) including all six kelurahan (urban villages).

Climate
Tolitoli has a tropical rainforest climate (Af) with moderate rainfall in March and April and heavy rainfall in the remaining months.

References

External links
  Local Government of Tolitoli Regency

Regencies of Central Sulawesi